Ismael Esteban Agüero (born 16 September 1983 in Torrelavega) is a Spanish cyclo-cross cyclist. He competed in the men's elite event at the 2016 UCI Cyclo-cross World Championships in Heusden-Zolder.

Major results

Cyclo-cross

2004–2005
 1st  National Under-23 Championships
2005–2006
 1st  National Under-23 Championships
2015–2016
 3rd National Championships
 3rd Gran Premi del Valles
2016–2017
 1st  National Championships
 1st Overall 
 1st Elorrioko Basqueland Ziklokrosa
 1st Asteasuko Ziklo-krosa
 1st Trofeo San Andres de Ciclo-cross
 1st Gran Premi Les Franqueses del Valles
 1st Ziklokross Laudio
 2nd Ziklokross Igorre
 2nd Cyclo-cross de Karrantza
 2nd Ciclocross Joan Soler
2017–2018
 1st  National Championships
 1st Gran Premi Les Franqueses del Valles
 3rd Abadinoko Udala Saria Ziklokrosa
2018–2019
 1st Cyclo-cross de Karrantza
 1st Ciclo-cross Ciudad de Xativa
 2nd National Championships
 3rd Abadiñoko Udala Saria
2019–2020
 1st Overall 
1st Gran Premio Ciudad de Pontevedra
 2nd Cyclo-cross de Karrantza
 2nd Ziklokross Laudio
 2nd Gran Premi Les Franqueses
 2nd Ciclo-cross Ciudad de Xativa
 2nd Abadiñoko Udala Saria
 3rd Ziklokross Igorre
 3rd Gran Premi Internacional Ciutat de Vic
 3rd Trofeo San Andres
2020–2021
 3rd National Championships

Road
2005
 1st Stage 4 Vuelta Ciclista a Navarra
2006
 1st Overall Vuelta a Tenerife
1st Stage 2

References

External links 
 

1983 births
Living people
Cyclo-cross cyclists
Spanish male cyclists
People from Torrelavega
Cyclists from Cantabria